William Salter Austen Williams (born 6 October 1992) is a New Zealand and English cricketer. He made his List A debut for Canterbury on 18 January 2017 in the 2016–17 Ford Trophy. He made his Twenty20 debut for Canterbury in the 2017–18 Super Smash on 14 December 2017.

He was the leading wicket-taker in the 2017–18 Plunket Shield season for Canterbury, with 19 dismissals in eight matches. In June 2018, he was awarded a contract with Canterbury for the 2018–19 season. On 9 January 2020, in the 2019–20 Super Smash against the Wellington Firebirds, Williams took a hat-trick.

In June 2020, he was offered a contract by Canterbury ahead of the 2020–21 domestic cricket season. In October 2020, in the second round of the 2020–21 Plunket Shield season, Williams took his first five-wicket haul in first-class cricket. In the next round of the tournament, he took another five-wicket haul, with 5/26 against Northern Districts.

In June 2022, Williams was signed on a short-term overseas contract by Lancashire County Cricket Club to play in the County Championship in England. The following month, Williams was signed as a local player by Lancashire until the end of the 2025 season and ending his Canterbury career.

He also flies planes.

References

External links
 

1992 births
Living people
New Zealand cricketers
Canterbury cricketers
Lancashire cricketers
Cricketers from Christchurch